Nico Rieble (born 22 August 1995) is a German professional footballer who plays as a left back for SV Wehen Wiesbaden.

Career

Career statistics

References

External links

1995 births
Living people
People from Rastatt
Sportspeople from Karlsruhe (region)
Footballers from Baden-Württemberg
German footballers
Association football midfielders
TSG 1899 Hoffenheim II players
VfL Bochum players
FC Hansa Rostock players
VfB Lübeck players
SV Wehen Wiesbaden players
2. Bundesliga players
3. Liga players
Regionalliga players